Gastão d'Avila Melo Brun (born October 13, 1944) is a Brazilian Olympic sailor in the Soling class in the 1976 and 1980 Summer Olympics. In 1976, he finished 10th together with his brother Vicente Brun and Andreas Wengert, and in 1980 he finished 6th together with his brother and Roberto Luiz Souza. He has also won two Soling World Championships and sailed in the Star World Championships.

References

Living people
1944 births
Brazilian male sailors (sport)
Brazilian people of German descent
Olympic sailors of Brazil
Sailors at the 1976 Summer Olympics – Soling
Sailors at the 1980 Summer Olympics – Soling
South American Champions Soling
Star class sailors
Soling class world champions